Duncan Matthews may refer to:
 Duncan Matthews (rugby union) (born 1994), South African rugby union player
 Duncan Matthews, a character in the X-Men: Evolution television series